Randolph I. Dorn (born September 10, 1953) is an American educator and politician who served as the 14th Washington State Superintendent of Public Instruction from 2009 to 2017. A member of the Democratic Party, he previously served as a member of the Washington House of Representatives, representing the 2nd district from 1987 to 1995.

References

External links

1953 births
American educators
Democratic Party members of the Washington House of Representatives
Washington (state) Superintendents of Public Instruction
20th-century American politicians
21st-century American politicians
Living people
University of Idaho people